Ringer is the name of three fictional supervillains appearing in American comic books published by Marvel Comics.

Publication history
The fictional character of the Ringer was initially introduced in the Marvel comic book Defenders issue #51 (September 1977), and was created by writer David Anthony Kraft and artist Keith Giffen. He subsequently appeared in Peter Parker, the Spectacular Spider-Man #58 (September 1981).

The Ringer was one of the victims featured in the 1986 storyline involving the Scourge of the Underworld which spanned over several titles, where numerous minor supervillains were murdered by a vigilante. He was killed in the "Bar With No Name" massacre along with 17 other supervillains in Captain America #319 (January 1986). It was this massacre that served as the climax to the storyline, which gave Captain America the clues he needed to find and stop the killer. The Ringer has made posthumous appearances in Sensational She-Hulk #53 (July 1993) and #59 (January 1994), and the inter-company crossover Avengers/JLA #4 (December 2003). He later appeared again in Code of Honor #3 (April 1997), a series that took place before the massacre. 

A "proto-husk" of the Ringer, an artificial copy of him, appeared in Deadpool #0 (December 1998), and was destroyed by Deadpool. The Ringer's wife, Leila Davis, survived him and became a supervillain in her own right, first appearing in the miniseries The Deadly Foes of Spider-Man #1-4 (May–August 1991), and subsequently appearing as Hardshell in the miniseries The Lethal Foes of Spider-Man #1-4 (September–December 1993), and as the new Beetle in issues #48-56 of the Thunderbolts series (March–November 2001). The Ringer appeared in flashbacks during a number of Leila's appearances. In fact, in a flashback in The Lethal Foes of Spider-Man #4, it was revealed that Davis had barely survived the massacre, and was transformed into a cyborg named Strikeback. Strikeback appeared as himself in issues #3-4 of The Lethal Foes of Spider-Man. However, he was killed off again, off-panel this time, as shown in a flashback in Thunderbolts #56. The Ringer had an entry in two editions of the Official Handbook of the Marvel Universe, including issue #19 of the Deluxe Edition (December 1987), and issue #9 of the All-New Official Handbook of the Marvel Universe A-Z (November 2006).

A second character named the Ringer was introduced in Marc Spector: Moon Knight issue #10 (January 1990), and was created by writer Chuck Dixon and artist Sal Velluto. He first appeared during the Acts of Vengeance storyline. This Ringer also had appearances in: The Incredible Hulk Annual #17 (1991), Marvel: Year in Review '92 (1992), Captain America #411-413 (January–March 1993), Sensational She-Hulk #59 (January 1994), and Punisher War Journal #4 (April 2007). This Ringer also had an entry in the All-New Official Handbook of the Marvel Universe A-Z issue #9, where his real name was revealed as Keith Kraft—bearing the same surname as the creator of the original Ringer. This Ringer appeared as a member of Norman Osborn's "Shadow Initiative" in Avengers: The Initiative #26-35.

A version of the Ringer was introduced under the Ultimate Marvel imprint, in Ultimate Spider-Man #91 (May 2006), and was created by writer Brian Michael Bendis and artist Mark Bagley.

Fictional character biography

Anthony Davis

A former engineer for NASA, professional criminal Anthony Davis grew jealous of the wealthy Kyle Richmond. Designing a suit of battle armor that would be constructed by the Tinkerer, Davis, calling himself the Ringer, broke into one of Richmond's buildings to rob it. Richmond confronted the Ringer in his guise of Nighthawk II, breaking several of Davis's teeth in the process. Davis was arrested and jailed, where it took a prison dentist several weeks to rebuild his broken teeth.

Humiliated by his defeat at Nighthawk's hands, Davis decided he was not cut out for a life of crime. He had previously designed an improved version of his old battlesuit, which remained in the Tinkerer's warehouse, which he planned to rent out to various criminal contacts as part of a get-rich-quick scheme. As Davis tested the suit, the Beetle broke into the shop to retrieve his own equipment. Easily subduing the Ringer, the Beetle brought him back to his hideout, where he forced Davis to wear the suit to battle Spider-Man, tricking him into thinking a new ring the Beetle had added to the suit would explode if the Ringer did not obey. The Ringer, deathly afraid of battling another superhero, was dealt a humiliating defeat by Spider-Man, who broke his repaired dental work and left him webbed for the police. To add to Ringer's indignity, the explosive charge merely destroyed a recording device the Beetle had installed in his suit to obtain live combat data of Spider-Man.

Upon his release from prison, the Ringer avoided New York City and its super heroes and operated as a costumed criminal primarily in the Midwest, sinking into petty crime and being viewed as a loser in the supervillain community. On a visit to the Bar With No Name in Medina County, Ohio, one of a number of similar secret meeting places for costumed criminals, the Ringer was contacted by Gary Gilbert, who was formerly the costumed terrorist called Firebrand. Gilbert invited the Ringer to attend a meeting at the bar to discuss strategies for dealing with Scourge, the mysterious vigilante who had murdered a large number of costumed criminals. The Ringer came to the meeting, but, unfortunately for him, so did Scourge, disguised as the bartender. Scourge slaughtered the Ringer and all the other criminals who were present, shooting them with explosive bullets.

Upon hearing of his supposed death, the Ringer's wife Leila Davis became a criminal herself, plotting to get revenge on the Beetle, who she blamed for her husband's humiliation, although she was thwarted by Spider-Man. When she joined a group of other villains in attempting to kill the wall-crawler, she was saved during the battle by her husband, who appeared as the cyborg Strikeback. Davis revealed that he had not actually died in the Scourge's massacre, but was barely alive when A.I.M. agents investigated the murder, seeking information on the technology used by the dead criminals. AIM created a new cyborg body for him, and he worked for the organization for some time before striking out on his own. As Strikeback, Davis was a much more skilled fighter than he was as the Ringer, defeating Boomerang, Swarm, the Vulture and Stegron. However, the dinosaur man badly damaged Strikeback's cybernetic systems during the battle, which caused them to slowly break down. During this time, he enjoyed a happy, if brief, retirement with Leila before dying. Leila herself would later perish in battle with the villain Graviton.

Arnim Zola later created a proto-husk of him, but Deadpool killed it.

Keith Kraft
The designs for the Ringer battlesuit are later used by another criminal named Keith Kraft who re-establishes the Ringer persona. He would prove to be as inept as Davis initially was. The Ringer teams up with Coachwhip and Killer Shrike to attack Moon Knight during the events of the Acts of Vengeance, a plan to destroy superheroes. He is defeated quickly. He is later employed by Justin Hammer, alongside Blacklash and Barrier. He attempts to trick Thunderbolt II into stealing some experimental aircraft plans, but is foiled by the Hulk and the ancient society known as the Pantheon.

Kraft shows up at Stilt-Man's funeral at the Bar with No Name where the Punisher poisoned the drinks and blew up the bar. Only medical attention prevents the Ringer and other villains from dying.

The Ringer is shown as a new member of Osborn's Shadow Initiative. He accompanies the team to liberate the Negative Zone prison. Ringer later assisted Hood into fighting Counter Force. He's then defeated by the Avengers Resistance in their last assault at Camp Hammer.

Ringer later appeared as a member of the Shadow Council's Masters of Evil.

Unnamed criminal
Roderick Kingsley later sold the Ringer gear to an unnamed criminal. Ringer, Steeplejack and Tumbler are shown to be in the services of Roderick Kinglsley. They were later ambushed by the Goblin King's servants Menace and Monster (the "Goblin" form of Carlie Cooper).

Following Spider-Man's victory over the Goblin King, Ringer was among the former Hobgoblin minions at the Bar with No Name where they encounter Electro.

While Spider-Man and Ms. Marvel are fighting Doctor Minerva during the Spider-Verse storyline, the Ringer robs the Diamond District only to be defeated by the new hero Silk.

In the Slide-Away Casino, Melter and Killer Shrike take Ringer to the back room. Black Cat shows him various items and tells him that even she cannot steal everything and sometimes must pay for them and asks him how is she supposed to do that when nobodies like him do not pay her weekly cut. Ringer tells Black Cat he did not pay because he was captured by Silk, owed the Spot for getting him out of jail, and had to pay Tinkerer for new equipment. He tells her that they worked in some jobs before and remembers her having a heart and asks for compassion. Black Cat hesitates long enough for the Ringer to attack them, hitting Felicia in her arm before she takes him down. Black Cat tells Ringer he will make three times the cut and will also serve as an example, having Killer Shrike and Melter beat him up. Melter and Killer Shrike then bring in Ringer and Black Cat tells Ringer to spread the word that no one steals from her.

Roderick Kingsley later regains Ringer's services.

Ringer and Man Mountain Marko attack a book fair to rob it only to be defeated by Spider-Man.

Powers, abilities, and equipment
The original Ringer wore devices on the wrists of his body armor that allowed him to condense rings with tensile strength approaching steel appearing out of the air to use as weapons. This fired a variety of rings, including explosive rings, freezing rings, and constriction rings. He could also use a series of interlocking rings used as a ladder, a lasso, or a whip. In later versions of his suit, he had a "particulate-matter condenser", which could form rings from soot and smog in the air. Anthony Davis was a skilled inventor and engineer.

As Strikeback, Davis possessed the ability to levitate, fire powerful energy bursts from his wrists similar to Iron Man's repulsor rays, and teleport himself and others. He was also a gifted mechanical engineer who designed his own equipment, although it was actually constructed by the Tinkerer.

The second Ringer used equipment similar to the original's.

Other versions

Ultimate Marvel
In Ultimate Spider-Man #91, the Ringer appeared, but ended up defeated by both Spider-Man and Shadowcat. He was handed over to the police. He would not again appear until the 150th issue where Spider-Man is fighting him after he stole $11,000 worth of Diamonds. During the battle the two caused millions of dollars in damages. Spider-Man beats him and he is again taken off to jail.

He later appears attempting to rob a bank, until stopped by the new Spider-Man.

Earth-65
On Earth-65, the Ringer is an overweight African-American woman who wears a belt that shoots the rings. She is defeated by Spider-Man when he arrives at the dimension to look for his father.

References

External links
Ringer I at Marvel.com

Characters created by David Anthony Kraft
Characters created by Keith Giffen
Comics characters introduced in 1977
Fictional engineers
Fictional NASA people
Marvel Comics cyborgs
Marvel Comics supervillains